Daniel Nestor and Nenad Zimonjić were the defending champions, but lost to Bob Bryan and Mike Bryan in the final match.

Seeds

Draw

Draw

References
 Doubles Draw

Davidoff Swiss Indoors - Doubles
Doubles